Movie Love: Complete Reviews 1988–1991 (1991) is the 11th and last collection of film reviews by the critic Pauline Kael and covers the period from October 1988 to March 1991, when she chose to retire from her regular film reviewing duties at The New Yorker. In the "Author's Note" that begins the anthology, Kael writes that this period had "not been a time of great moviemaking fervor", but "what has been sustaining is that there is so much to love in movies besides great moviemaking."

She reviews 85 films in this final collection. She gives rich praise to directors and performers she admires - in this collection for example, Pedro Almodóvar; 'Generalissimo Francisco Franco kept the lid on Spain for 36 years; he died in 1975 and Almodóvar is part of what jumped out of the box. The most original pop writer-director of the 1980s; he's Jean-Luc Godard with a human face - a happy face.' And Chet Baker in Let's Get Lost; " He's singing a torch song after the flame is gone; he's selling the romance of burnout." Perhaps pre-eminently in this collection she praises Brian De Palma's Casualties of War; "Some movies - La Grande Illusion, and Shoeshine come to mind, - can affect us in more direct, emotional ways than simple entertainment movies. They have more imagination, more poetry, more intensity than the usual fare; they have themes, and a vision. Casualties of War has this kind of purity." And she's cool to what she regards as second rate - Field of Dreams, for example, - 'That the film is sincere doesn't mean it's not manipulative.' Or The Rainbow: "The ads for  The Rainbow feature a banner line, 'Ken Russell is the purest interpreter D. H. Lawrence could have hoped for.' In his worst nightmare."

The films she recommends include; Patty Hearst, Women on the Verge of a Nervous Breakdown, True Believer, Scrooged, The Dressmaker, Dangerous Liaisons, Out Cold, Let's Get Lost, Say Anything..., Casualties of War, Ghostbusters II, Batman, The Fabulous Baker Boys, My Left Foot, Enemies, The Tall Guy, The Grifters, Vincent & Theo, Everybody Wins, L.A. Story.

Notably absent from this collection of reviews are the longer general essays on the films that Kael had written and included in past anthologies.

This book is out-of-print in the United States, but is still published by Marion Boyars Publishers of the United Kingdom.

Movies reviewed

 Bird
 Gorillas in the Mist
 Patty Hearst
 Another Woman
 Punchline
 Madame Sousatzka
 Women on the Verge of a Nervous Breakdown
 Things Change
 A Cry in the Dark
 The Good Mother
 Scrooged
 High Spirits
 The Dressmaker
 Tequila Sunrise
 Mississippi Burning
 Dangerous Liaisons
 Working Girl
 The Accidental Tourist
 Beaches
 Dirty Rotten Scoundrels
 Rain Man
 True Believer
 High Hopes
 Three Fugitives
 Out Cold
 Parents
 Cousins
 New York Stories
 The Adventures of Baron Munchausen
 The Dream Team
 Crusoe
 Heathers
 Let's Get Lost
 Field of Dreams
 Scandal
 Say Anything
 The Rainbow
 Miss Firecracker
 Indiana Jones and the Last Crusade
 Vampire's Kiss
 Dead Poets Society
 Batman
 Ghostbusters II
 Casualties of War
 My Left Foot
 Penn & Teller Get Killed
 A Dry White Season
 The Fabulous Baker Boys
 Breaking In
 Johnny Handsome
 Drugstore Cowboy
 Crimes and Misdemeanors
 Dad
 Fat Man and Little Boy
 The Bear
 Henry V
 Valmont
 Blaze
 Back to the Future Part II
 The Little Mermaid
 Enemies
 Driving Miss Daisy
 Music Box
 Roger & Me
 Always
 Born on the Fourth of July
 Glory
 Internal Affairs
 GoodFellas
 The Tall Guy
 Postcards from the Edge
 Pacific Heights
 Avalon
 The Grifters
 Reversal of Fortune
 Vincent & Theo
 Dances with Wolves
 Edward Scissorhands
 The Sheltering Sky
 Everybody Wins
 The Godfather Part III
 The Bonfire of the Vanities
 Awakenings
 Sleeping with the Enemy
 L.A. Story

References

1991 non-fiction books
Books of film criticism
Books about film
Books by Pauline Kael
American non-fiction books
E. P. Dutton books